Mendoza Airpark is an airport serving Mendoza, capital of Mendoza Province, Argentina. The airport is on the northwest side of the city.

The Mendoza Province Ministry of Security operates the airport as Base Condor, with a unit of police helicopters on the base.

There is high terrain northwest of the airport.

See also

Transport in Argentina
List of airports in Argentina

References

External links 
OpenStreetMap - Base Condor

Airports in Mendoza Province
Mendoza Province